WBAZ (102.5 FM) is an adult contemporary music formatted radio station licensed to Bridgehampton, New York, and serving eastern Long Island and Southeastern Connecticut. The station is owned by WEHM on-air talent Lauren Stone (68.8%) and her father Roger W. Stone (31.2%), the Chairman/CEO of Kapstone Paper & Packaging Company in Northbrook, Illinois, as licensee LRS Radio, LLC. The station's studios are located in Water Mill, New York and shared by WBEA and WEHM/WEHN. WBAZ's transmitter is located in Southampton, New York.

History

The 102.5 frequency first signed on in April 1996 as WLIE, with a satellite-fed country music format. Put on the air by WBAZ-owner Mel Kahn and his MAK Communications, less than a year later, the country format was replaced with classic rock.

In early 1998, the 102.5 frequency changed again as it took on new calls, WBSQ, and a new Hot Adult Contemporary format (again satellite-fed) as Q-(Bright)102.5. Launched as a complement to WBAZ at 101.7 FM, and not much else, the station remained an afterthought in the scheme of East End radio.

When Kahn sold WBAZ and WBSQ to AAA Entertainment, owner of locally-run rival WBEA at 104.7 FM in 2000, the future of WBSQ's Hot AC format was limited. Studies by AAA showed that the majority of WBAZ's listeners were concentrated in the Southampton/Bridgehampton area and that the slightly worse 102.5 FM signal would be ideal for the station. In April 2001, WBSQ took the WCSO calls used by AAA as placeholders and would simulcast and assume WBAZ's format and calls that May. The 101.7 frequency soon became home to WBEA whereas WBEA's former home at 104.7 FM became home to a classic hits station targeted to New London, Connecticut.

In 2005, WBAZ, WBEA, and sister stations WEHM and WHBE would be purchased by Long Island Radio Broadcasting, a unit of Cherry Creek Radio.

Personalities
Walker Vreeland began hosting the Morning Show on WBAZ in May 2007. In September 2010 he moved to the Afternoon Drive time slot. Vreeland resigned from WBAZ on December 9, 2016.

References

Previous logos

External links
 

BAZ
Mainstream adult contemporary radio stations in the United States
Mass media in Suffolk County, New York
Radio stations established in 1996
1996 establishments in New York (state)